Nunić  is a village in the municipality of Kistanje, in the Bukovica region of Croatia.

Notable structures 

 Church of Saint Anthony of Padua

References

Populated places in Šibenik-Knin County